This article is a list of G.D. Interclube players.  G.D. Interclube is an Angolan football (soccer) club based in Luanda, Angola and plays at Estádio 22 de Junho.  The club was established in 1976.

2020–2021
G.D. Interclube players 2020–2021

2011–2020
G.D. Interclube players 2011–2020

2001–2010
G.D. Interclube players 2001–2010

1991–2000
G.D. Interclube players 1991–2000

1981–1990
Inter de Luanda players 1981–1990

External links
 Official club site
 Girabola.com profile
 Zerozero.pt profile
 Facebook profile

References

G.D. Interclube
G.D. Interclube players
Association football player non-biographical articles